Ciudad de Villa de Álvarez  is a city in the Mexican state of Colima. It is the municipal seat of Villa de Álvarez municipality. The city is adjacent to the northwest side of the state capital city of Colima and the two can be considered as "twin cities", with Ciudad de Villa de Álvarez having a 2005 census population of 97,701 and Colima having a population of 123,597. They are both part of the Colima-Villa de Álvarez metropolitan area, which includes the population of Colima municipality (132,237) and Villa de Álvarez municipality (100,121). The city and the municipality of Villa de Álvarez both rank third in the state in their respective categories in population, behind only Colima itself and Manzanillo. Villa de Álvarez municipality has an area of 428.4 km² (165.4 sq mi).

See also 
2003 Colima earthquake

References
Link to tables of population data from Census of 2010 INEGI: Instituto Nacional de Estadística, Geografía e Informática
Colima Enciclopedia de los Municipios de México

External links
Ayuntamiento de Villa de Álvarez Official website

Populated places in Colima